The Siren's Reign is a 1915 American silent drama film directed by Robert G. Vignola and starring Alice Hollister, Harry F. Millarde, Anna Q. Nilsson, Robert Walker and Henry Hallam. An upright young man marries a siren, a drunken, unfaithful woman, who mothers his child, and then ruins him financially and morally.

Plot 
Story of a man who disregards the quiet affection of a fine girl to marry a frivolous actress with whom he is infatuated. Several years later, after the woman has wrecked his life, the husband gives up in despair and shoots himself. Not until then does he realize the other woman's affection towards him. When he does he places his little daughter in her care.

Themes 
The characters played respectively by Alice Hollister and Anna Nelson are "contrasting roles (that) make for an interesting commentary on the changing role of women in the early 20th century."

Cast 

 Alice Hollister as Grace - a Soubrette
 Harry F. Millarde as Hugh Blake - The Husband
 Anna Q. Nilsson as Marguerite Morrison - The Other Woman
 Robert Walker as Morrison - Marguerite's Brother
 Henry Hallam as Hardy - a Faithful Employee

References

External links 

1915 films
American silent short films
American black-and-white films
Silent American drama films
Films directed by Robert G. Vignola
1910s American films
American drama short films